John Loebs (September 10, 1853 – after 1930) was a member of the Wisconsin State Assembly.

Biography
Loebs was born on September 10, 1853 in Sherman, Sheboygan County, Wisconsin, the son of Lewis Loebs and Christina Elizabeth née Saeman. He attended Northwestern College before moving to Campbellsport, Wisconsin, where he was an officer for the First National Bank of Campbellsport. He married Ella Mary Denniston in 1880. Together with William Knickel, John Loebs operated the former Saeman store in Campbellsport until it was destroyed by a fire in 1908.

Career
Loebs was elected to the Assembly in 1902. He was a Republican.

References

See also
The Political Graveyard

People from Sheboygan County, Wisconsin
People from Campbellsport, Wisconsin
Republican Party members of the Wisconsin State Assembly
1853 births
Year of death missing